Siswanto Bin Moksun Haidi (born 22 February 1972) is a Malaysian cricketer. A right-handed batsman and right-arm fast-medium bowler, he played for the Malaysia national cricket team in 1998.

Biography
Born in Tawau in 1972, Siswanto Haidi first played for Malaysia in 1998, playing against Pakistan International Airlines in the Wills Cup, a Pakistani domestic one-day tournament. He also played against Lahore City in the tournament, and played in the Saudara Cup match against Singapore in August.

In September, he represented Malaysia in the cricket tournament at the 1998 Commonwealth Games, hosted in Kuala Lumpur, playing against Zimbabwe and Jamaica. These were his final List A matches, ending his List A career with no runs and no wickets. His last appearance for Malaysia was in the ACC Trophy in Nepal in October.

References

1972 births
Living people
People from Sabah
Malaysian cricketers
Cricketers at the 1998 Commonwealth Games
Commonwealth Games competitors for Malaysia